Gloria Frazier (born April 19, 1955) is an American politician who has served in the Georgia House of Representatives since 2007.

References

1955 births
Living people
Democratic Party members of the Georgia House of Representatives
People from Caddo Parish, Louisiana
African-American state legislators in Georgia (U.S. state)
21st-century American politicians
21st-century American women politicians
Women state legislators in Georgia (U.S. state)
21st-century African-American women
21st-century African-American politicians
20th-century African-American people
20th-century African-American women